The Big Island Interscholastic Federation or BIIF Consists of 21 high schools that sponsor a number of athletic sports, including football, basketball, volleyball and soccer.
All schools are located on the Island of Hawaii, which is governed by the County of Hawaii.

Member institutions

Current members

Former members

Championships

Baseball

bold denotes HHSAA tournament champions

Cross Country

bold denotes HHSAA tournament champions

Track and Field

Football

bold denotes HHSAA tournament champions

Judo

Boys Soccer

bold denotes HHSAA tournament champions

Girls Soccer

bold denotes HHSAA tournament champions

Wrestling

Boys Volleyball

bold denotes HHSAA tournament champions

Girls Volleyball

bold denotes HHSAA tournament champions

Boys Basketball

bold denotes HHSAA tournament champions
* - While winning four consecutive Territorial titles from 1946 to 1949, Hilo did not participate in the BIIF circuit between 1947 and 1949

References

Hawaii high school athletic conferences